Goodenia watsonii is a species of flowering plant in the family Goodeniaceae and is endemic to the south-west of Western Australia. It is a perennial herb with egg-shaped to elliptic leaves mostly at the base of the plant, and thyrses of white, cream-coloured or bluish flowers.

Description
Flowering occurs from October to February and the fruit is a more or less spherical capsule  in diameter.

Taxonomy and naming
Goodenia watsonii was first formally described in 1893 by Ferdinand von Mueller and Ralph Tate in Botanisches Centralblatt from material collected by Richard Helms "at Gnarlbine" during the Elder Exploring Expedition. The specific epithet (watsonii) honours "Professor Watson, of the Adelaide University.

In 1990, Roger Charles Carolin described two subspecies in the journal Telopea and the names are accepted by the Australian Plant Census:
 Goodenia watsonii subsp. glandulosa Carolin has the peduncles, pedicels ovary and parts of the petals covered with soft glandular hairs, and a bluish corolla with a yellow centre, or whitish;
 Goodenia watsonii F.Muell. & Tate subsp. watsonii has most glabrous flower parts and a white corolla.

Distribution and habitat
This goodenia grows in heath in the south-west of Western Australia. Subspecies glandulosa is restricteed to areas between Lake Grace and Hyden.

Conservation status
Both subspecies of G. watsonii are classed as "not threatened" by the Western Australian Government Department of Parks and Wildlife.

References

watsonii
Eudicots of Western Australia
Plants described in 1893
Taxa named by Ferdinand von Mueller
Taxa named by Ralph Tate
Endemic flora of Australia